Rivière-Saint-Jean is an unorganized territory in the Gaspésie–Îles-de-la-Madeleine region of Quebec, Canada. It is bisected by Quebec Route 198 that runs along the banks of the York River.

The territory is named after the Saint-Jean River that is considered one of the best salmon rivers in Quebec. Portions of the river are protected in the Rivière-Saint-Jean Wildlife Reserve.

Demographics

Population

See also
 List of unorganized territories in Quebec

References

Unorganized territories in Gaspésie-Îles-de-la-Madeleine